Edward Gibbon Wakefield (20 March 179616 May 1862) is considered a key figure in the establishment of the colonies of South Australia and New Zealand (where he later served as a member of parliament).  He also had significant interests in British North America, being involved in the drafting of Lord Durham's Report and being a member of the Parliament of the Province of Canada for a short time.

He was best known for his colonisation scheme, sometimes referred to as the Wakefield scheme, which aimed to populate the new colony South Australia with a workable combination of labourers, tradespeople, artisans and capital.  The scheme was to be financed by the sale of land to the capitalists who would thereby support the other classes of emigrants.

Despite being imprisoned for three years in 1827 for kidnapping a fifteen-year-old girl in Britain, he enjoyed a distinguished political career.

Early life and education
Wakefield was born in London in 1796, the eldest son of Edward Wakefield (1774–1854), a distinguished surveyor and land agent, and Susanna Crush (1767–1816). His grandmother, Priscilla Wakefield (1751–1832), was a popular author for the young, and one of the introducers of savings banks.

He was the brother of: Catherine Gurney Wakefield (1793–1873) (who was the mother of Charles Torlesse (1825–1866)); Daniel Bell Wakefield  (1798–1858); Arthur Wakefield (1799–1843); William Hayward Wakefield (1801–1848); John Howard Wakefield (1803–1862); Felix Wakefield (1807–1875); Priscilla Susannah Wakefield (1809–1887); Percy Wakefield (1810–1832); and an unnamed child born in 1813.

Wakefield was educated at Westminster School in London, and Edinburgh.

Early career, marriage and family
He served as a King's Messenger, carrying diplomatic mail all about Europe during the later stages of the Napoleonic Wars, both before and after the decisive Battle of Waterloo in 1815.

In 1816, he eloped with a Miss Eliza Pattle and they were subsequently married in Edinburgh. It appears to have been a love match, but the fact that she was a wealthy heiress probably played a part, with Edward receiving a marriage settlement of £70,000 (almost US$7m in 2018 dollars), with the prospect of more when Eliza turned 21.

The married couple, accompanied by the bride's mother and various servants, moved to Genoa, Italy, where Wakefield was again employed in a diplomatic capacity. Here his first child, Susan Priscilla Wakefield, known as Nina, was born in 1817. The household returned to London in 1820 and a second child, Edward Jerningham Wakefield, was born. Four days later Eliza died, and Edward resigned his post. The two children were brought up by their aunt, Wakefield's older sister, Catherine.

Nina was suffering from tuberculosis, and Wakefield took his daughter to Lisbon in Portugal in the hope of recovery. He employed a young peasant girl, Leocadia de Oliveira, whom he later fostered, to help care for Nina, and after Nina's death in 1835, sent Leocadia on to Wellington, New Zealand, where she met John Taine and had 13 children.

Abduction scandal (1826)

Although wealthy by contemporary standards, Wakefield was not satisfied. He wished to acquire an estate and enter Parliament, for which he lacked sufficient capital. Through deception he wed another wealthy heiress in 1826 when he abducted 15-year-old Ellen Turner, after luring her from school with a false message about her mother's health. Wakefield was brought to trial for the case known as the Shrigley abduction in 1827 and, along with his brother William, sentenced to three years in Newgate prison; the marriage, which had not been consummated, was dissolved by a special act of parliament.

He then attempted to overturn his father-in-law's will and gain control of the remainder of Eliza's estate. Wakefield emerged from this endeavour unsuccessful and with a reputation tarnished by suspicions that he had resorted to forgery and perjury to strengthen his case.

Influence on British colonisation (1829–1843)

Principles of "systematic colonisation"
He turned his attention while in prison to colonial subjects, and considered the main causes of the slow progress of the Australian colonies in the enormous size of the landed estates, the reckless manner in which land was given away, the absence of all systematic effort at colonisation, and the consequent discouragement of immigration and dearth of labour. He proposed to remedy this state of things by the sale of land in small quantities at a sufficient price, and the employment of the proceeds as a fund for promoting immigration. These views were expressed in his Letter from Sydney (1829; published under a false name), published while he was still in prison, but often quoted as if written on the spot. He had published pamphlets in prison in 1828 under the title "Sketch of a Proposal for Colonising Australia", which had created a lot of interest.

The National Colonization Society (also spelt National Colonisation Society) was created in 1830 in order to advocate for the type of "systematic colonisation" set out in Letter from Sydney, based on three principles: careful selection of emigrants; the concentration of settlers; and the sale of land at a fixed, uniform, "sufficient price", to provide funding for new settlers. Wakefield was a founder member, and Robert Gouger was elected (or appointed) inaugural secretary of the society, although he was later to fall out with Wakefield when they disagreed on the price that should be charged for land. Members over time included Robert Rintoul (editor of The Spectator), Charles Buller, John Stuart Mill, Sir William Molesworth, W. W. Whitmore, and Sir William Hutt. Jeremy Bentham supported the ideas of the society. Colonel Robert Torrens and Robert Wilmot-Horton were on the committee of the society. The society published The Outline of a Plan of a Colony, later expanded and elaborated upon by Wakefield.

In 1831, Lord Howick , Under-Secretary of the Colonial Office was won over by the idea of selling land at a fixed, uniform price, and based his "Ripon Regulations" on this principle, issued in February 1831, which abolished free land grants, replacing them with and land sales at public auction, set at a minimum price of five shillings per acre in the colony of New South Wales.

After his Letter from Sydney in 1829, Wakefield's name became associated with other "scientific theories" of colonisation similar to his. People who accepted these ideas were usually on the side of the colonists, and were called "systematic colonizers", or (more commonly) colonial reformers and "radical imperialists". 

After his release Wakefield briefly turned his attention to social questions at home, and produced a tract on the Punishment of Death (1831), with a graphic picture of the condemned sermon in Newgate, and another on the rural districts, with an equally powerful exhibition of the degraded condition of the agricultural labourer. He soon, however, became entirely engrossed with colonial affairs.

South Australia 

In 1831, having impressed John Stuart Mill, Robert Torrens and other leading economists with the value of his ideas, Wakefield became involved in various schemes to promote the colonisation of South Australia. He believed that many of the social problems in Britain were caused by overpopulation, and he saw emigration to the colonies as a useful safety valve. He set out to design a colonisation scheme with a workable combination of labourers, artisans and capital. The scheme was to be financed by the sale of land to the capitalists who would thereby support the other classes of emigrants.

It took several attempts before the Province of South Australia was established. Although initially, Wakefield was a driving force, he found that as it came closer to fruition, he was allowed less and less influence, until he was frozen out almost completely, whereupon he took offence and severed his connections with the scheme.

America
However, he did not lose interest in colonisation as a tool for social engineering. In 1833 he published anonymously England and America, a work primarily intended to develop his own colonial theory, which is done in the appendix entitled "The Art of Colonization." The body of the work contains many new ideas, some of them reaching apparently extreme conclusions. It contains the distinct proposal that the transport of letters should be wholly free, and the prediction that, under given circumstances, the Americans would raise "cheaper corn than has ever yet been raised".

New Zealand Association 
Soon, a new project was under way, the New Zealand Association. In 1837 the Colonial Office gave the New Zealand Association a charter to promote settlement in New Zealand. However, they attached conditions that were unacceptable to the members of the Association. After considerable discussion, interest in the project waned. Wakefield was undoubtedly one of the most influential voices in the Association, but he discovered another interest, Canada.

Canada (first time)
The 1837 Rebellion in Lower Canada had been suppressed, but the colony was in turmoil. The Government of Lord Melbourne wanted to send John George Lambton, Lord Durham to settle the disputes. He and Wakefield had been working together closely on the New Zealand scheme, and he was a convert to Wakefield's colonial theories; the report embodied Wakefield's ideas, and he surreptitiously leaked it to The Times, to prevent the government from tampering with it. Durham was only prepared to accept the task if Wakefield accompanied him as Commissioner of Crown Lands. However, they both knew that Wakefield would be completely unacceptable to the British government, so Durham planned to announce the appointment only after he had reached Canada. Wakefield and his son, Edward Jerningham Wakefield, sailed secretly for Canada in 1838, but before they arrived word had leaked out, and the appointment was forbidden by London. Despite this, Durham retained him as an unofficial representative, advisor and negotiator, giving him effectively the same powers he would have had if he been appointed.

Between them they successfully defused the situation and brought about the union of Upper and Lower Canada. Since Durham was ill for much of his time in Canada, a great deal of the credit for the success of his mission belongs to his advisers, Wakefield and Charles Buller. Clearly Wakefield had become a capable negotiator. Shortly afterwards political manoeuvring in London made Durham's position untenable, he resigned and they all returned to Britain.

Here Durham went into seclusion while he wrote and then presented to Parliament a report on his administration. Although their names are not mentioned it seems likely that report was written cooperatively by the three men, Durham, Buller and Wakefield. Eventually this report, and its conclusions, became a blueprint for development of British Colonial policy.

The New Zealand Company
The defunct New Zealand Association reformed itself as the New Zealand Company in June 1838. By the end of the year they had purchased a ship, the Tory. Early in 1839 they discovered that although they now complied with the conditions the government had laid down for the old New Zealand Association, it was not prepared to honour its promises. Furthermore, it was actively considering making New Zealand a British Colony in which case land sales would become a government monopoly.

At a meeting in March 1839, Wakefield was invited to become the director of the New Zealand Company. His philosophy was the same as when he planned his elopements: "Possess yourself of the Soil and you are Secure."

It was decided that the Tory would sail for New Zealand as soon as possible. His brother William was appointed the leader of the expedition with his son Jerningham as his nominal secretary. They had some difficulty finding a suitable captain for the Tory, but then found Edward Main Chaffers who had been sailing master on HMS Beagle during Fitzroy's circumnavigation. Dr. Ernst Dieffenbach was appointed as scientific officer, and Charles Heaphy as a draughtsman. The Tory left London on 5 May and called at Plymouth to complete the fitting out. Fearing a last-minute attempt by the government to prevent her sailing, Wakefield hastened down to Plymouth and advised their immediate departure. The Tory finally quit English shores on 12 May 1839 and reached New Zealand 96 days later.

Wakefield did not sail with the colonists, and many years were to pass before he saw New Zealand. He may have recognised that he did not have the patience, the skills or the talents needed on a frontier. His talents lay in visualising dramatic plans and grandiose schemes, ignoring the details, and then persuading other people to get involved. He was a salesman, a propagandist and a politician, secretly inspiring and guiding many parliamentary committees on colonial subjects, especially on the abolition of penal transportation.

By the end of 1839, he had dispatched eight more ships to New Zealand, before he even knew of the success of the Tory expedition led by his brother William. He then recruited another brother, Arthur, to lead another expedition, this time to settle in the Nelson area at the top of the South Island. Charles Torlesse, the 16-year-old son of his elder sister Catherine, and Rev. Charles Martin Torlesse, rector of Stoke-by-Nayland in Suffolk, sailed with Arthur as a trainee surveyor. By now William's daughter, Emily, and his ward, Leocadia, were already in New Zealand. Two more of his brothers also went to New Zealand later, along with numerous nieces and nephews.

Canada (second time)

While active with the New Zealand Company, Wakefield had maintained his interest in Canadian affairs. He was involved with the North American Colonial Association of Ireland (NACAI). At his instigation, the NACAI were trying to purchase a large estate just outside Montreal where they wanted to establish another colonial settlement. Wakefield pushed the scheme with his usual energy; apparently, the government did not object in principle, but they strenuously objected to Wakefield having any part of it.

However, trusted or not by the politicians, Wakefield was involved in the scheme. The NACAI sent him back to Canada as their representative; he arrived in Montreal in January 1842 and stayed in Canada for about a year. At this stage, Canada was still coming to terms with the union of Upper and Lower Canada. There were serious differences between the French and English Canadians, with the English Canadians holding the political clout. Wakefield skilfully manipulated these differences; it was fairly easy for him to get the support of the French Canadians. By the end of that year he had got himself elected to the Canadian Parliament. Having been elected, he immediately returned to Britain.

He returned to Canada in 1843 and spent some months there.  In the parliamentary session of 1843 he initially aligned himself with the French-Canadian group, but part-way through the session he left them and supported the Governor on an important vote. However, when he heard of his brother Arthur's death at the Wairau Affray, he immediately quit Canada and never returned. This appears to be the end of his involvement with Canadian affairs, apart from being paid about £20,000 by the NACAI for his work in Canada.

England and illness (1844–1852)
Wakefield returned to England in early 1844 to find the New Zealand Company under serious attack from the Colonial Office. He threw himself into the campaign to save his project. In August 1844 he had a stroke, followed in later months by several other minor strokes, and he had to retire. There is also a possibility that his mental health was not too sound in the succeeding months. His son Jerningham returned from New Zealand about this time and cared for him. In August 1845 he went to France to recuperate and to give himself a break from New Zealand affairs. It did not serve his purpose and he returned to London two months later in a semi-invalid state. During his convalescence he wrote his book A View of the Art of Colonization, in the form of letters between a "Statesman" and a "Colonist".

By January 1846 Wakefield was back to his scheming. By now Gladstone was Colonial Secretary. Wakefield approached him early in the New Year with a fairly radical plan that both the Government and the New Zealand Company should withdraw from New Zealand affairs and the colony should become self-governing. While it might have been a good idea, Wakefield wanted it accepted immediately, and became at first heated and then distressed when some months later, it was still being considered.

In August 1846, he had another, potentially fatal stroke. His friend, Charles Buller took up the negotiations. In May 1847 the British Government agreed to take over the debts of the New Zealand Company and to buy out their interests in the Colony. The directors readily accepted the offer. Wakefield found he was powerless and unable to influence the decision, which did not please him.

Without notice, his youngest brother Felix Wakefield, who had been in Tasmania since the early 1830s, reappeared in England accompanied by eight of his children, having abandoned his wife and youngest child in Australia. Felix had no money and no prospects and was unable to provide for his family. Wakefield found him somewhere to live and farmed out the children among relatives, but it was another year before his health was strong enough to take over the role of surrogate father, Felix being apparently unable to do anything for his family.

Meanwhile, Wakefield was getting involved in a new scheme. He was working with John Robert Godley to promote a new settlement in New Zealand, this one to be sponsored by the Church of England. This plan matured to become the Canterbury Settlement. The first ship sailed from England in December 1849 with Godley in command of the expedition. Jerningham Wakefield also sailed with them, his health and finances ruined by his dissipated lifestyle in London. The first immigrant ships bound for Canterbury sailed from Plymouth in September 1850, and others followed.

In the same year, Wakefield co-founded the Colonial Reform Society with Charles Adderley, a landowner and member of parliament for North Staffordshire.

Felix was causing problems back in Britain and causing Wakefield a great deal of grief. Felix decided that settlement in New Zealand was the solution to all his problems. Wakefield reluctantly sponsored his passage to Canterbury, where Felix was allocated  (40 hectares) of land near Sumner. He and six of his children arrived in Lyttelton in November 1851. A short time later one of the other settlers described him as "the worst man we have in Canterbury".

During 1851 and 1852 Wakefield continued to work for the Canterbury Association and also worked towards making New Zealand a self-governing colony. The New Zealand Constitution Act was passed on 30 June 1852. There was general satisfaction among New Zealanders about this, although they were less happy to discover that the new government was to be saddled with the remaining debts of the defunct New Zealand Company.

Move to New Zealand (1853)
Wakefield now decided that he had achieved everything he could in England; it was time to see the colony he felt he had created. He sailed from Plymouth in September 1852, knowing he would never return. His sister Catherine and her son Charley came to see him off. Then, at the last minute, his father appeared. Edward Wakefield was now 78 years old; he and Wakefield had not spoken since the Ellen Turner abduction 26 years before. They were reconciled, and the elder Edward died two years later.

The ship arrived at Port Lyttelton on 2 February 1853. Wakefield had travelled with Henry Sewell who had been deputy chairman and full-time manager of the Canterbury Association. It seems likely that he expected to be welcomed as a founding father of the colony; to be feted and immediately asked to assume the leadership of colony. However, colonisation had inevitably changed the perspectives of the people of Canterbury. Many of them felt they had been let down and cheated by the Association, and the two arrivals were firmly linked in their minds with the broken promises and disappointments of the Association.

James Edward FitzGerald, who was one of the leaders of Canterbury, and who was elected as Superintendent of the Canterbury Province a few months later (in July 1853), declined to meet with Wakefield for some days and certainly was unwilling to relinquish control to someone he probably saw as a tainted politician from London.

Within a very short time Wakefield was completely disenchanted with Canterbury. He claimed the citizens were far too parochial in their outlook; they were far more concerned with domestic issues rather than national politics. Clearly they were not worthy of Edward Gibbon Wakefield and after only one month he left Canterbury and sailed for Wellington.

There was enough political ferment in Wellington to satisfy even Wakefield. Governor George Grey had just proclaimed self-government for New Zealand, but it was a watered down version, significantly less "self-government" than was described in the New Zealand Constitution Act of the year before. In his own way George Grey was every bit as unscrupulous as Wakefield, and he had very firm ideas on what was good for New Zealand. They were not necessarily bad ideas, but they were different from Wakefield's. It seems likely that even before they met both men knew they would clash.

When they arrived in Wellington, Wakefield declined to go ashore until he knew he was going to be properly received by the Governor. Grey promptly left town. Sewell went ashore and met with various dignitaries including Daniel Bell Wakefield, another of the brothers who had been in Wellington for some years practising law and was Attorney General of the Province. He also managed to get an address of welcome for Wakefield, written by Isaac Featherston and signed by many of the citizens.

Wakefield went on the attack almost as soon as he landed. He took issue with George Grey on his policy on land sales. Grey was in favour of selling land very cheaply to encourage the flow of settlers. Wakefield wanted to keep the price of land high so that the growth of the colony could be financed by land sales; it was a fundamental tenet of his colonial theory. He and Sewell applied for an injunction to prevent the Commissioner of Crown Lands selling any further lands under Governor Grey's regulations. The Crown Commissioner was Wakefield's second cousin, Francis Dillon Bell, early New Zealand really was a Wakefield family business.

Within a month of arriving in Wellington, Wakefield began a campaign in London to have him recalled not knowing he had already applied to leave the colony. Meanwhile, Grey was in control. He responded to the attacks on him by questioning Wakefield's integrity, always an easy target. Particularly he focussed on the generous fees that had been paid to Wakefield as a Director of the New Zealand Company at a time when it was reneging on its debts in New Zealand. This served to remind the people of Wellington just how badly they had been let down by the company and how angry they felt about it. Wakefield managed to clear himself of the actual charges, but a great deal of dirt was thrown around.

Member of Parliament

Elections for the Wellington Provincial Council and General Assembly, the national parliament, were held in August 1853. Wakefield stood for the Hutt electorate, and to the surprise of some, and the disappointment of others, he was elected to both the Provincial Council and the General Assembly.

The first sitting of the Provincial Assembly was in October 1853. Wakefield was not only the senior member but also clearly the most experienced politically. However, the Assembly was controlled by the Constitutional Party led by Dr. Isaac Featherston and they had been heavily involved in the recent criticism of his integrity. Working in opposition, Wakefield probably made certain that the Provincial Assembly became a working democracy rather than a Constitutional Party oligarchy. His wide knowledge of parliamentary law and custom made certain that the body of the assembly could not be ignored by the ruling party.

Early in 1854 the town of Wellington held a Founders' Festival. Three hundred people attended including sixty Māori and all the Wakefields. The principal toast of the evening was to: "The original founders of the Colony and Mr. Edward Gibbon Wakefield". Whatever the vicissitudes of the last few months, it confirmed Wakefield as one of the leading political figures of colony, possibly the only one with stature to take on Governor Grey.

Responsible government conflict
Grey was gone and Colonel Robert Wynyard was acting as Governor. Wynyard opened the 1st New Zealand Parliament on 27 May 1854. Wakefield and James Fitzgerald each immediately began manoeuvering for positions of influence, with Wakefield moving a motion for Parliament to appoint its own responsible governments (Ministers of the Crown). Wakefield took a position supporting Wynyard, while FitzGerald took an opposite tack. The dispute over responsible government dragged on. As a compromise, on 7 June, Wynyard appointed James FitzGerald to the Executive Council. Wakefield was not asked to form a part of the ministry.

By July 1854 FitzGerald was in serious conflict with Wynyard; FitzGerald's Executive Council (cabinet) resigned on 2 August 1854. Wakefield was summoned to form a government; he refused to do so. He said instead that he would advise Wynyard, so long as he acted on his advice alone. In effect, he sought to turn Wynyard into his own puppet. He did not have a majority of supporters in the house, and the assembly was paralysed. Wynyard prorogued parliament on 17 August, but he had to recall it again by the end of the month when he needed money to run the country. The new ministry, headed by Thomas Forsaith, composed mainly of Wakefield's supporters and it was soon clear that he was the de facto head of the ministry. However, they failed to survive an early vote of no confidence, and New Zealand's second government collapsed on 2 September 1854. In the remaining two weeks of the Assembly's life they managed to pass some useful legislation before they were dismissed and new elections called.

Wakefield held two election meetings for his constituents in the Hutt Valley, which were well received. A third meeting was scheduled but never happened. On the night of 5 December 1855, Wakefield fell ill with rheumatic fever and neuralgia. He retired to his house in Wellington. He retired from the Hutt seat on 15 September 1855 and retired from all political activity, making no more public appearances. He lived for another seven years, but his political life was over.

Death and legacy

Wakefield's niece, Alice Mary Wakefield, who had cared for him since his 1846 stroke, continued to look after him until his death in Wellington in 1862.

In 1839 John Hill named the Wakefield River, a river north of Adelaide in the new colony of South Australia, after Wakefield, which later led to the naming of Port Wakefield. Wakefield Street, Adelaide, was also named after him by the street-naming committee.

Wakefield is mentioned and criticised in Chapter 33 of Karl Marx's Das Kapital (Volume 1) and also in Henry George's How to Help the Unemployed.

By the turn of the twenty-first century, the direct descendants of the Wakefield family left in New Zealand were William Wakefield Lawrence Clague resident in Kapiti, and descendants of Edward's sister Catherine Gurney Wakefield, who married Charles Torlesse. A great-great-nephew of William and Edward Gibbon Wakefield, William Clague, is the great-great-grandson of John Howard Wakefield, one of the original brothers. John Howard Wakefield spent most of his life in India, ending his days back in England unlike his two better-known siblings.

In 2020, some Wellington councillors called for Wakefield monuments to be removed.

Selected publications
Facts Relating to the Punishment of Death in the Metropolis by Edward Gibbon Wakefield, James Ridgway, 1831.
A View of the Art of Colonization by Edward Gibbon Wakefield, 1849.

References

Further reading
 

How to Help the Unemployed, by Henry George in The North American Review, Volume 158, Issue 447, February 1894.
Adventure in New Zealand by Edward Jerningham Wakefield, John Murray, 1845
An Account of the Settlements of the New Zealand Company by The Hon HW Petre, Smith, Elder and Co, 1842.
The Modern Theory of Colonisation  last chapter in Karl Marx's Capital, Vol I focused on Wakefield's theory.
 Ashby, Abby and Audrey Jones. The Shrigley Abduction by 2003
 Burns,  Patricia.  Fatal Success: A History of the New Zealand Company (Heinemann Reed, 2002) 

 Fairburn, Miles (1990): 
 Fardy, Bernard D. William Epps Cormack, Newfoundland Pioneer 1985  page 46–48 section describing The Wakefield Scheme.
 Foster, Bernard John (1966):The Wakefield Myth in the 1966 Encyclopaedia of New Zealand
 Garnett, Richard. Edward Gibbon Wakefield: The Colonization of South Australia and New Zealand (Longmans, Green & Company, 1898). online
  Hamilton, Reg. Colony : strange origins of one of the earliest modern democracies (2010) online
 Hastings, W. K. "The Wakefield colonisation plan and constitutional development in South Australia, Canada and New Zealand." Journal of Legal History 11.2 (1990): 279–299.
 Henning, Jon "New Zealand: An Antipodean Exception to Master and Servant Rules," New Zealand Journal of History (2007) 41#1 pp 62–82
 Johnston, H.J.M. (1976): 
 Kondo, Takahiro. Edward Gibbon Wakefield on Colonial Government and Patronage (Annals of the Society for the History of Economic Thought (Keizaigakushi Gakkai Nempo), 1989). online 
 Langley, Michael. "Wakefield and South Australia." History Today (Oct 1969), Vol. 19 Issue 10, pp 704–712; online.
 Mills, Richard Charles. The colonization of Australia (1829–42): the Wakefield experiment in empire building (1915). online
 Morrell, William Parker (1966):"Wakefield, Edward Gibbon" in the 1966 Encyclopaedia of New Zealand
 Olssen, Erik. "Mr. Wakefield and New Zealand as an Experiment in Post-Enlightenment Experimental Practice," New Zealand Journal of History (1997) 31#2 pp 197–218.
 Stuart, Peter Alan. Edward Gibbon Wakefield in New Zealand: His Political Career, 1853-4 (Victoria University Press, 1971).

|-

1796 births
1862 deaths
Burials at Bolton Street Cemetery
People from the British Empire
Classical economists
Immigration to New Zealand
Members of the Wellington Provincial Council
Members of the Legislative Assembly of the Province of Canada from Canada East
Members of the New Zealand House of Representatives
New Zealand MPs for Hutt Valley electorates
Civil servants from London
English emigrants to New Zealand
Edward Gibbon
19th-century New Zealand politicians
Advocates of colonization
Criminals from London
British economists